Percy Carl Klaehn (1896 – May 8, 1984) was a Canadian educator, soldier, and politician who served as mayor of Saskatoon, Saskatchewan from 1963 to 1964.

Early life and career 
Klaehn was born in Valleyfield, Quebec and came west with his family while still young. Klaehn served with Princess Patricia's Canadian Light Infantry during the First World War and was wounded at the Battle of Vimy Ridge. At the start of the Second World War, Klaehn joined the Saskatoon Light Infantry. He was named commander of The Cameron Highlanders of Ottawa and took part in the Allied invasion of Normandy in June 1944. He later commanded the 8th Canadian Infantry Brigade in Belgium. He then went to England as commander of the Canadian School of Infantry. In the fall of 1945, Klaehn returned to Saskatoon as regional administrator for the federal Department of Veterans Affairs. In 1946, he became commander of the 17th Infantry Brigade and later the 21st Militia of Saskatoon. Klaehn retired from the military in 1958 but was named honorary lieutenant-colonel for the North Saskatchewan Regiment.

Between the First and Second World Wars, Klaehn also taught school in Saskatoon, North Battleford and Weyburn. He was a high school coach for Ethel Catherwood, who later won a gold medal for Canada in the high jump at the 1928 Summer Olympics.

Political career 
Klaehn was elected to Saskatoon city council in a 1958 by-election and served on council until 1963. He was elected mayor following the resignation of Sidney Buckwold in 1963. He was defeated by E. J. Cole when he ran for reelection in 1964, which was considered a significant upset.

Personal life 
Klaehn and his wife Helen had four children: David, Carolyn, Laura, and Valerie. After leaving politics, Klaehn returned to teaching. He served as principal of Biggar Composite School and also taught in Rosetown and Harris. He returned to Saskatoon after he retired from teaching and later died there at the age of 88. He is buried in Woodlawn Cemetery with Helen, who died in 1997.

Klaehn was named an officer of the Order of the British Empire.

See also 
 List of mayors of Saskatoon

References

External links 
 

1896 births
1984 deaths
Canadian military personnel from Quebec
Mayors of Saskatoon
Officers of the Order of the British Empire
Canadian Expeditionary Force soldiers
Canadian Army personnel of World War II
Saskatoon city councillors
Canadian Militia officers
Canadian Army officers
Canadian military personnel of World War I
Canadian Expeditionary Force officers
Princess Patricia's Canadian Light Infantry soldiers
Saskatoon Light Infantry
Cameron Highlanders of Ottawa
North Saskatchewan Regiment
Burials in Canada